GRP All-Star Big Band is a jazz album by the big band of the same name. The album was nominated for the Best Large Jazz Ensemble Recording at the 35th Annual Grammy Awards.

The band was assembled in celebration for the tenth anniversary of GRP Records and featured the top musicians of the label. The album itself was recorded and mixed over a two day session and filmed for the accompanying video directed by Ed Libonati.

Track listing

Personnel 

 Dave Valentin – flute 
Eddie Daniels – clarinet
 Ernie Watts – flute, saxophones
 Tom Scott – flute, saxophones
 Nelson Rangell – flute, saxophones
 Bob Mintzer – flute, bass clarinet, saxophones
 Eric Marienthal – flute, saxophones
 Arturo Sandoval – trumpet, flugelhorn
 Sal Marquez – trumpet, flugelhorn
 Randy Brecker – trumpet, flugelhorn
 George Bohanon – trombone
 Kenny Kirkland – piano
 Russell Ferrante – piano
 David Benoit – piano
 Gary Burton – vibraphone
 Lee Ritenour – guitar
 John Patitucci – bass
 Dave Weckl – drum set
 Alex Acuña – percussion
 Dave Grusin – producer, piano

References 

1992 albums
GRP Records albums
Big band albums